Obadiah German (April 22, 1766September 24, 1842) was an American lawyer and politician. He was most notable for his service as a U.S. Senator from New York (1809-1815) and Speaker of the New York State Assembly in 1819.

Life
He was born on April 22, 1766 in Amenia, New York. He studied law, was admitted to the bar in 1792, and commenced practice in Norwich. A Democratic-Republican, he was a member of the New York State Assembly from 1798 to 1799, 1804 to 1805, and 1807 to 1809.

In 1809, he was elected a U.S. Senator from New York. He served one term, March 4, 1809 to March 3, 1815 and was not a candidate for reelection. German was known as a critic of the lack of military preparations made in advance of the War of 1812, and voted against the declaration of war. In 1812, German was one of the founding trustees of Hamilton College. He was First Judge of the Chenango County Court from 1814 to 1819. He was also a State militia officer, eventually becoming a major general.

Supporting DeWitt Clinton's Erie Canal project, German took part in planning and overseeing its construction after being appointed to the state Public Works Commission in 1817. German returned to the Assembly in 1819 as a member of the Clintonian faction of the Democratic-Republican Party and was chosen to serve as Speaker. Afterwards he resumed the practice of law. German became a Whig when that party was organized.

He died on September 24, 1842 in Norwich, New York. He was buried at North Norwich Cemetery in North Norwich, New York.

Family
German had seven children with his first wife, Mary Ann Lewis, known as Ann, who died in 1829.

Lewis German (d. 1819) was a lieutenant in the United States Navy and a veteran of the War of 1812.

Morris

Sutherland

Albert was an innkeeper in Norwich before moving to Ohio.

Walter, who succeeded his father in the family's Norwich mercantile business. He served as a militia captain during the War of 1812 and became insolvent after his business failed in 1820.

Julia, who was the wife of Stephen Anderson of Norwich, and later resided in Wisconsin.

Maria (d. 1876), who was the wife of Reverend George Harmon and resided in Wisconsin and Ohio.

After the death of his first wife he married Mary Ann Knight, a woman much younger than he. They had two children, Frederick and George. By some accounts the marriage was not a happy one, with Mary Ann Knight and the children living in Syracuse while Obadiah German continued to reside in Norwich.

Widow
Obadiah German's widow Mary Ann Knight claimed to have been defrauded by her brother (some accounts say German's brother) of German's $70,000 estate (about $1.7 million in 2014). She took up residence in Syracuse and became a public charge after being found "in a state of great destitution", her efforts at earning a living through painting and "fancy work" having failed. Her claim to be German's widow was not believed in Syracuse until it was confirmed after her death.

Legacy
The town of German, New York is named after him.

Attempts to locate portrait
German is one of approximately 50 former senators for whom the U.S. Senate's photo historian has no likeness on file.  Attempts to locate one have proved unsuccessful.

References

Sources

Internet

External links

Obadiah German at Political Graveyard

Further reading

The New York Civil List compiled by Franklin Benjamin Hough (pages 63, 172, 177f, 180ff, 194, 275 and 359; Weed, Parsons and Co., 1858)

United States senators from New York (state)
1766 births
1842 deaths
Speakers of the New York State Assembly
People from Amenia, New York
People from Norwich, New York
New York (state) state court judges
New York (state) Democratic-Republicans
Democratic-Republican Party United States senators